American singer and actor Meat Loaf (1947–2022) released twelve studio albums, five live albums, seven compilation albums, one extended play and thirty-nine singles. In a career that spanned six decades, he sold over 100 million records worldwide. According to Recording Industry Association of America, he sold 25 million certified records in the US alone.

Bat Out of Hell (1977) has sold 44 million copies worldwide, becoming the fourth best-selling album in history and is certified 14× Platinum in the US. Bat Out of Hell has also sold 3.4 million copies in the UK, making it the UK's 14th best-selling album of all time. His biggest success after that came with Bat Out of Hell II: Back into Hell (1993), which has sold over 15 million copies worldwide. The album's lead single "I'd Do Anything For Love (But I Won't Do That)" remains his biggest hit, reaching number-one in 28 countries.

Albums

Solo albums

As Stoney & Meatloaf

Live albums

Compilation albums

Singles

Video

Guest appearances
1974: The Rocky Horror Show (Starring Tim Curry And The Original Roxy Cast): "What Ever Happened to Saturday Night", "Eddie's Teddy"
1975: The Rocky Horror Picture Show Soundtrack: "Hot Patootie"
1976: Free-for-All: "Writing on the Wall", "Street Rats", "Together", "Hammerdown", "I Love You So I Told You a Lie"
1994: The Glory of Gershwin: "Somebody Loves Me"
1998: Chef Aid: The South Park Album: "Tonight is Right for Love"
2006: The Pick of Destiny: "Kickapoo"

Notes

References

External links

Meat Loaf
Discographies of American artists
Discography